Margaret Lilardia Tucker MBE (28 March 1904 – 23 August 1996) was an Aboriginal Australian activist and writer who was among the first Aboriginal authors to publish an autobiography, in 1977.

Early life 
Margaret Tucker was born at Warrangesda Mission near Narrandera to William Clements, a  Wiradjuri man, and Theresa Clements, née Middleton, a member of the Yorta Yorta Nation. She spent her childhood at Cummeragunja Aboriginal Reserve. 

In 1917, aged 13, she was forcibly removed to the Cootamundra Domestic Training Home for Aboriginal Girls, where she was badly treated. After two years of training in white domestic practices, in 1919 she was sent to work for a white family in Sydney, where she was abused. The Aborigines Protection Board intervened and she was given another placement from which she ran away. In 1925 the Board released her and she moved to Melbourne.

Activism 
In the 1930s Tucker began campaigning for Indigenous rights with William Cooper, Bill Onus and Douglas Nicholls and in 1932 was one of the founding members of the Australian Aborigines' League. During this time she married and gave birth to a daughter, Mollie. At first influenced by the Communist Party of Australia, she gravitated later towards the conservative Moral Re-Armament movement. This deepened with an eight-month stay at Mackinac Island. In the 1960s she founded the United Council of Aboriginal and Islander Women and in 1964 she was the first Indigenous appointee to the Victorian Aborigines Welfare Board.

Order of the British Empire 
Tucker was awarded the MBE in 1968, recognising her welfare services to Aboriginal Australians. Her 1977 autobiography If Everyone Cared was one of the first books to bring to light the mistreatment of her people.

Awards 
Margaret Tucker was inducted in the Victorian Women's Honour Roll, one of the first to receive the honour, in 2001.

References 

1904 births
1996 deaths
Australian autobiographers
Australian indigenous rights activists
Women human rights activists
Australian Members of the Order of the British Empire
Indigenous Australian writers
Members of the Stolen Generations
Wiradjuri people
Women autobiographers
20th-century Australian women writers
20th-century Australian writers
Yorta Yorta people